John James Jones House (also known as Jones-Cox House and as The Shadows) is a historic house located at 525 Jones Avenue in Waynesboro, Georgia.

Description and history 
The two-story house is a mix of Greek Revival and Victorian architecture. The home was built for John James Jones. It was added to the National Register of Historic Places on February 15, 1980.

See also
National Register of Historic Places listings in Burke County, Georgia

References

Houses on the National Register of Historic Places in Georgia (U.S. state)
Burke County, Georgia
Houses completed in 1876
Greek Revival houses in Georgia (U.S. state)